The New South Wales Government Railways constructed in 1903 a device for measuring the length of its lines of railway. That authority named the machine a Rotameter. It consisted of a four-wheel trolley with an additional large fifth wheel which traveled along the running surface of the rail. Its last recorded use was in the 1920s.

References

Railway buildings and structures
Measuring instruments